Christine Joy Gardner (born 1969) is an American communication scholar and journalist. She is an associate professor and the chair of the Department of Communication Arts at Gordon College.

Early life and education
Gardner was born in 1969. She has received degrees from Seattle Pacific University (BA in history), the University of Washington (MA in communications), and Northwestern University (PhD in philosophy in communication studies).

Work

Gardner's articles have frequently been published in Christianity Today.

In 2012, her book Making Chastity Sexy won the Stephen E. Lucas Debut Publication Award for a scholarly monograph or book in the field of communication studies. In preparation for writing the book, Gardner spent five years doing research at chastity events in various locations in the United States and sub-Saharan Africa. In the United States, she focused her investigation on three evangelical organizations that advocate sexual abstinence: Silver Ring Thing, True Love Waits, and Pure Freedom.

Personal life
Gardner self-identifies as evangelical. She is from Normal, Illinois.

References

1969 births
Living people
21st-century American journalists
21st-century American non-fiction writers
21st-century American women writers
21st-century evangelicals
American celibacy advocates
American evangelicals
American magazine writers
American relationships and sexuality writers
American religion academics
American social sciences writers
American spiritual writers
American women academics
American women journalists
American women non-fiction writers
Christian scholars
Communication scholars
Evangelical writers
Gender studies academics
Gordon College (Massachusetts) faculty
Meaning in religious language
Northwestern University alumni
Philosophers of religion
Rhetoric theorists
Seattle Pacific University alumni
University of Washington alumni
Wheaton College (Illinois) faculty
Women science writers
Writers from Illinois